WXLZ is a Country formatted broadcast radio station licensed to St. Paul, Virginia, serving the Lebanon/Norton/Castlewood/Nickelsville area. WXLZ is owned and operated by Yeary Broadcasting, Inc.

References

External links
 Country 107.3 WXLZ Online

XLZ (AM)
Radio stations established in 1981
XLZ